The St. John's Red Storm baseball team represents St. John's University, in New York City in college baseball. The program is classified in the NCAA Division I, and the team competes in the Big East Conference. The team is coached by Mike Hampton. The St. John's baseball team has been to the College World Series six times and have sent more than 100 players on to professional baseball careers.

History
St. John's has won nine Big East Championships in 1987, 1991, 1992, 2005, 2007, 2008, 2012, 2015, and 2018.

It has also won the Big East Tournament nine times, in 1986, 1986, 1988, 1993, 1997, 2010, 2012, 2015, and 2018, the most of any school. 

The program has appeared in 37 NCAA Regionals and six College World Series, with its highest place finish being fourth place in 1968 and its most recent appearance in 1980.

Facilities
The team plays at the 3,500-seat Jack Kaiser Stadium, dedicated in 2007, to the Hall of Fame Coach and former St. John's Athletic Director.  The stadium is one of the largest college baseball stadiums in the northeast, and is a featured venue on the EA Sports MVP NCAA Baseball video game. The stadium was conceived out of a deal between the university and the Giuliani administration.  The administration wanted to find a location for a single-A team that would be affiliated with the New York Mets. Expressing concern about quality of life issues and the spending of public money for a private religious institution, surrounding neighborhood civic groups and local politicians protested the plan.  In order to placate their concerns, however, the Mets offered to open it up to the communities for local high school games and youth programs. This stadium was built despite large protests by community residents as well as State Senator Frank Padavan (while also using city financing) The Red Storm played the first ever game at the Mets' new ballpark, Citi Field on March 29, 2009.

Coaches

Only those who coached 3 or more seasons and 30 or more games.

Notable players

MLB First Round Picks

First Team All-Americans

Individual Awards

National Awards
NCBWA National Freshman Hitter of the Year
Jeremy Baltz (2010)
NCBWA National Freshman Pitcher of the Year
Sean Mooney (2017)

Big East Awards
Rookie/Freshman of the Year
Rich Aurilia (1990)
Mike Maerten (1991)
Jeremy Baltz (2010)
Michael Donadio (2014)
Josh Shaw (2016)
Sean Mooney (2017)
Coach of the Year
Joe Russo (1990, 1991)
Ed Blankmeyer (1996, 2005, 2007, 2008, 2012, 2015, 2017, 2018)
Player of the Year
John Valente (2018)
Pitcher of the Year
Tom Migliozzi (1991)
C.J. Nitkowski (1994)
Craig Hansen (2005)
George Brown (2008)
Ryan McCormick (2015)
Thomas Hackimer (2016)
Sean Mooney (2017)

References

 
1906 establishments in New York City
Baseball teams established in 1906